Anne Kjersti Suvdal (born 30 July 1987) is a former Norwegian handball player who last played for Storhamar HE.

She was a part of the Norwegian squad at the European championship in 2006, but was dropped from the national team shortly after.

In November 2017, after making a comeback for Storhamar HE after giving birth, she ended her career.

Achievements
European Championship
Winner: 2006

References

1987 births
Living people
Norwegian female handball players
Sportspeople from Gjøvik